Elections to the Assembly of French Polynesia are scheduled to be held on 16 and 30 April 2023 in order to elect 57 representatives to the Assembly of French Polynesia. The last election was in 2018.

Background 
The 2018 French Polynesian legislative election saw the Tapura Huiraatira party led by Édouard Fritch emerge as the largest in the Assembly, winning 38 of the 57 seats. Fritch was re-elected as President of French Polynesia, while Gaston Tong Sang was elected President of the Assembly.

French Polynesia has been affected by the COVID-19 pandemic.

Electoral system 
The 57 members of the Assembly of French Polynesia are elected by a proportional multi-member list of two rounds, with a majority premium. Polynesia is a single constituency whose communes make up of eight sub-divisions called sections, each with a majority premium of 1 to 4 seats according to their population for a total of 19 premium seats.

Each list presents 73 candidates in the eight sections. Each list is composed alternately of a candidate of each sex. In the first round, the list having received an absolute majority of votes in its section is awarded the majority bonus, then the remaining seats are distributed proportionally among all the lists having crossed the electoral threshold of 5% of the votes according to the method of voting. If no list obtains more than 50% of the votes cast, a second round is held between all the lists having collected more than 12.5% of the votes, those having collected between 5% and 12.5% being able to merge with the lists that have been maintained. The leading list then gets the majority bonus, and the remaining seats are distributed proportionally under the same conditions.

The lists may be reimbursed for part of their campaign costs if they reach the threshold of 3% of the votes cast in the first round, provided that they comply with accounting transparency requirements and legislation on the format of documents.

Party participation
Prior to the election Tapura leader Édouard Fritch obtained a court ruling that the two-term limit applied to whole terms, and that therefore he was eligible to be elected as President despite having served in the role for nine years.

After being inactive for 15 years, Here Ai'a announced on 21 January 2023 that it would contest the 2023 election, and that its program would focus on independence.

In February 2023 A here ia Porinetia named Nuihau Laurey as head of its list. It published its full list on 25 February 2023.

On 14 February 2023 Tamatoa Perez announced he would contest the elections with the Te reo manahune party.

On 10 March 2023 Tāvini Huiraʻatira announced that Moetai Brotherson would be their candidate for the presidency.

On 14 March 2023 Heiura-Les Verts became the first party to formally submit a party list. Tāvini Huiraʻatira, Tapura Huiraatira, and A here ia Porinetia submitted their lists on 17 March.

References 

Elections in French Polynesia
French Polynesia
French Polynesia
Legislative